Morgan Christopher Hackworth (born January 2, 1997) is an American soccer player who plays as a defender for San Diego Loyal in the USL Championship.

Personal
Morgan is the son of former soccer player and Louisville City FC head coach John Hackworth. His youngest brother Larsen Hackworth current playing for St. Louis City SC 2.

References

External links
Profile at University of Akron

1997 births
Living people
Akron Zips men's soccer players
American soccer players
Association football defenders
Memphis 901 FC players
Peachtree City MOBA players
San Diego Loyal SC players
Soccer players from Florida
Sportspeople from Bradenton, Florida
Syracuse Orange men's soccer players
Tampa Bay Rowdies U23 players
USL Championship players
USL League Two players